Rob or ROB may refer to:

Places
 Rob, Velike Lašče, a settlement in Slovenia
 Roberts International Airport (IATA code ROB), in Monrovia, Liberia

People 
 Rob (given name), a given name or nickname, e.g., for Robert(o), Robin/Robyn
 Rob (surname)
 Rob., taxonomic author abbreviation for William Robinson (gardener) (1838–1935), Irish practical gardener and journalist

Fictional characters
 Rob, a character from the Cartoon Network series The Amazing World of Gumball
 ROB 64, a character in the Star Fox video game series

Arts, entertainment, and media

Gaming
 Castlevania: Rondo of Blood, a 1993 video game nicknamed Castlevania: ROB
 R.O.B., an accessory for the Nintendo Entertainment System

Reports
 ISM Report On Business (informally, "The R.O.B."), an economic report issued by the Institute for Supply Management
 Report on Business, or "ROB", a section of the Globe and Mail newspaper

Other uses in arts, entertainment, and media
 Rob Riley (comic strip), a British comic strip named after its titular character
 Rob (TV series), an American comedy show
 Rob the Robot (TV series), a TV series named after its titular character

Science and technology
 Re-order buffer, or ROB, used for out-of-order execution in microprocessors
 Robertsonian translocation, or ROB, a form of chromosomal rearrangement

Other uses 
 Rob (dog) (1939–1952), a dog awarded the Dickin Medal
 Rob, the verb for robbery
 Taeʼ language (ISO 639 code rob)

See also

 
 
 
 Rob Roy (disambiguation)
 Robb (disambiguation)